Lamos was a town of ancient Cilicia and later of Isauria, inhabited in Roman and Byzantine times. It was a bishopric; for its ecclesiastical history see Lamus (see).

Its site is located near the settlement of Adanda in Gürçam, Gazipaşa, Antalya Province, Turkey.

References

Populated places in ancient Cilicia
Populated places in ancient Isauria
Former populated places in Turkey
Roman towns and cities in Turkey
Populated places of the Byzantine Empire
History of Antalya Province